The Bachelor of Aviation is a bachelor's degree for studies within the aviation industry. In the United States, it takes an average of four to six years to complete this degree.  There are multiple areas of concentrations that a student can specify when going to college.

In India, Bachelor of Aviation courses take an average of three years to complete, with the most highly sought course being a BBA Aviation course.

Jobs
Students that study this degree pursue jobs in the aviation industry. This degree can train students in engineering, electronics, flying aircraft, managing air traffic, aircraft maintenance, aviation business, and more. Careers are available in all fields of the aviation industry, including pilots, air traffic control, airport and airline management, aircraft dispatching, aircraft maintenance, and more.  Some of the more specific jobs in aviation include:

Aerospace Engineer
Air traffic controller
Airport management and administration
Airport operations
Airport security
Airline Management
Aviation Safety Representative
Flight dispatcher
Airline Crew Support
Airline Pilot
Flight Instructor
Aircraft Maintenance Technician

Eligibility For Bachelor Of Aviation Courses 
Most universities only require that you gain admittance to the university. Aviation degrees deal in a wide variety of concentrations and each university has their own requirements. Depending on the university, enrollment in aviation courses is no different than any other academic course.  Contact each university and their aviation department for their specific enrollment requirements.

References

External links
 Griffith University - Bachelor of Aviation - Nathan
 Swinburne University | Melbourne, Australia - Bachelor of Aviation
 Edith Cowan University | Perth Australia - Bachelor of Aviation
 LeTourneau Polytechnic University
 University of Oklahoma Aviation
 Southeastern Oklahoma State University Aviation Sciences Institute
 Embry-Riddle Aeronautical University

Flight training